Year 164 (CLXIV) was a leap year starting on Saturday (link will display the full calendar) of the Julian calendar. At the time, it was known as the Year of the Consulship of Macrinus and Celsus (or, less frequently, year 917 Ab urbe condita). The denomination 164 for this year has been used since the early medieval period, when the Anno Domini calendar era became the prevalent method in Europe for naming years.

Events

By place

Roman Empire 
 Emperor Marcus Aurelius gives his daughter Lucilla in marriage to his co-emperor Lucius Verus.
 Avidius Cassius, one of Lucius Verus' generals, crosses the Euphrates and invades Parthia.
 Ctesiphon is captured by the Romans, but returns to the Parthians after the end of the war.
 The Antonine Wall in Scotland is abandoned by the Romans. 
 Seleucia on the Tigris is destroyed.
</onlyinclude>

Births 
 Bruttia Crispina, Roman empress (d. 191)
 Ge Xuan (or Xiaoxian), Chinese Taoist (d. 244)
 Yu Fan, Chinese scholar and official (d. 233)

Deaths

References 

 

als:160er#164